Language Inspectorate is a governmental body under the Ministry of Education of Estonia. The inspectorate was founded in 1990 as the State Language Board with the mandate to, as the Commissioner for Human Rights states, to facilitate the republic's expectation that people offering services to the public should speak Estonian. Since 1995, its director is Ilmar Tomusk. It carries out state supervision with the primary task to ensure that the Language Act and other legal acts regulating language use are observed. Non-observance of the Language Act may result in warnings, written orders or fines.

During the Soviet occupation, an intensive program of Russification had been undertaken. A massive program of Russian language education was imposed at the expense of the Estonian language and Russian replaced Estonian as the sole language in certain areas of the economy such as banking, mining, energy production, statistics, railways, naval and air transport. Estonians had to learn Russian in order to keep their jobs. By the 1980s, Russian was established as the official language while the Estonian language was effectively reduced to that of a de facto minority language within the country. Due to the increasing restrictions upon the public use of the Estonian language in Estonia, the extinction of the Estonian language had become a real possibility.

After the restoration of independence in 1989, the Estonian language was proclaimed the sole official state language and the Language Act was promulgated as a remedy to the problem of the growth of Russian monolingualism during the Soviet period. The Language Act was based upon the principle of Russian/Estonian bilingualism which requires that the holders of certain jobs be proficient in Estonian in addition to Russian. The Act impacted those who were employed in positions that involve communication with the public or subordinates in state administration and in most cases required an elementary level of knowledge of around 800 words, impacting about 12% of the Russian speaking population. The Language Inspectorate was thus established to supervise the implementation of the Language Act. Later, new Language Acts were adopted, in 1995 and 2011.

In 2006, the European Commission against Racism and Intolerance has noted that "it appears that no system has been put in place to monitor the Language Inspectorate's implementation of the Law on Language" and that "the Language Inspectorate does not appear to take into account regional specificities when applying the Language Law". In 2010, ECRI has repeated the recommendation to establish a monitoring mechanism for the work of the Language Inspectorate, and recommended "regular consultation with representatives of Russian-speaking minorities on the work of the Language Inspectorate in order to improve the manner in which it is perceived by members of this group".

According to the Commissioner for Human Rights of the Council of Europe, in 2007, the Language Inspectorate was given power to recommend the dismissal of employees with insufficient language proficiency, to make people holding language certificates re-sit an exam. According to comments of Estonian government to CoE report, that was factually incorrect as the Inspectorate has always had these powers from inception.

References

External links

Government agencies of Estonia
Language regulators